John Godard (fl. 1377–1402) of Sandwich, Kent served as an English Member of Parliament for Sandwich in the parliaments of January 1377, 1386, 1395, January 1397, 1399 and 1402.

References

14th-century births
15th-century deaths
People from Sandwich, Kent
14th-century English people
15th-century English people
English MPs January 1377
English MPs 1386
English MPs 1395
English MPs January 1397
English MPs 1399
English MPs 1402